The women's scratch competition at the 2019 UEC European Track Championships was held on 16 October 2019. Emily Nelson of Great Britain won the gold medal.

Results
First rider across the line without a net lap loss wins.

References

Women's scratch
European Track Championships – Women's scratch